Terror of the Red Mask is a 1960 Italian swashbuckler film co-written and directed  by Luigi Capuano and starring Lex Barker and Chelo Alonso.

It was shot at the De Paolis Studios in Rome. The film's sets were designed by the art director Giancarlo Bartolini Salimbeni.

Plot

Cast 
 
 Lex Barker as  Marco
 Chelo Alonso as  Karima
 Livio Lorenzon as  Astolfo
 Liana Orfei as  Jolanda
 Franco Fantasia as  Egidio
 Elio Crovetto as  Uguccione
 Enrico Glori
 Ugo Sasso as  Capo Ribelle
 Bruno Scipioni as  Ribelle
 Luigi Tosi as  Martino
 Marco Guglielmi as  Ivano
 Riccardo Billi as  Fanello

References

External links

  
1960s historical adventure films
Italian historical adventure films
Italian swashbuckler films    
Films directed by Luigi Capuano
Films set in the 16th century
1960s Italian-language films
1960s Italian films